Herchmer is an unincorporated area and community in Census division 23 in Northern Manitoba, Canada. It is on the Owl River, a tributary of Hudson Bay.

History
Named after the former Commissioner Lawrence Herchmer, Herchmer was founded with the building of the Hudson Bay Railway in the third decade of the 20th century. The original final section line route from Port Nelson was abandoned, leading to the construction of the new route of the final section which opened in 1929. This new line from Amery north to Churchill included Herchmers along the way. Herchmer lies on the line between the settlements of Silcox to the south and Kellett to the north.

Transportation
Herchmer is the site of Herchmer railway station, served by the Via Rail Winnipeg–Churchill train. There is no actual station anymore and no residents at Herchmer.

References

Unincorporated communities in Northern Region, Manitoba